Local elections were held in Scotland on 5 May 1988, to elect members to all 53 district councils under the Local Government (Scotland) Act 1973, which had established the two-tier system of regions and districts.

National results

|-
!colspan=2|Parties
!Votes
!Votes %
!Wards
|-
| 
|
|42.6
|553
|-
| 
|
|21.3
|113
|-
| 
|
|19.4
|162
|-
| 
|
|8.4
|84
|-
| 
|
|6.4
|231
|-
| style="width: 10px" bgcolor=|
| style="text-align: left;" scope="row" | Other
|
|
|
|-
!colspan=2|Total
! 
!n/a
!~1158
|}

Results by council area

Borders

Central

Dumfries and Galloway

Fife

Grampian

Highland

Lothian

Strathclyde

Tayside

References

 
1988
May 1988 events in the United Kingdom